Shea Ernshaw is an author from Oregon. She is a bestselling author known for her novels The Wicked Deep and Long Live The Pumpkin Queen. The Wicked Deep won the Oregon Book Award for Young Readers in 2019.

Works

Adult novels
A History of Wild Places

Young Adult novels
Long Live the Pumpkin Queen
A Wilderness of Stars
Winterwood
The Wicked Deep

References

Year of birth missing (living people)
21st-century American novelists
American women novelists
Writers from Oregon
Living people